This is a comprehensive listing of official releases by Melissa Auf der Maur, best known for her work in the alternative rock band Hole. Auf der Maur has released two solo studio albums, two extended plays and five singles, all of which have accompanying music videos.

Her first self-titled studio album, Auf der Maur was released in 2004 and was followed by Out Of Our Minds in 2010. Out Of Our Minds (commonly abbreviated as OOOM) is "part of a multidisciplinary Viking-themed project that includes a short film and comic book." This discography does not include material by Tinker, Hole, The Smashing Pumpkins, Hand Of Doom or The Chelsea.

Studio albums

I  PHI-MAdM Music, Inc. is the title of Auf der Maur's own label, a subsidiary of PHI, based in Montréal, Canada.
II  Sales figures based on online/non-retail sales from Auf der Maur's official web site from March–June 2010.

Extended plays

Singles

Other musical contributions

See also
Hole discography

References

External links
 
 

Auf der Maur
Auf der Maur